The Samsung Galaxy Watch Active is a smartwatch developed by Samsung Electronics. It was announced on 20 February 2019. The Galaxy Watch Active was scheduled for availability in the United States starting on March 8, 2019.

Specifications

References

External links 
Galaxy Watch Active on Samsung Newsroom

Consumer electronics brands
Products introduced in 2019
Smartwatches
Samsung wearable devices